U R My Jaan is a Hindi romance film and a remake of 1990's movie Pretty Woman (starring Richard Gere, Julia Roberts and Jason Alexander), released worldwide on 23 September 2011. The film was written and directed by the debuting Aron Govil,

Plot 
U R My Jaan is a love story about Reena (Preeti) and Akash (Mikaal) who are absolute opposites. Reena; a girl from Chandigarh who is a vivacious middle-class girl and nurtures her dream of making it big in Bollywood. Akash; from New York, is a renowned suave & ruthless billionaire, who will go to any lengths when it's about his business. They are brought  together by fate in Mumbai, and in their brief encounter, they manage to change  each other's lives forever.

Cast 
 Mikaal Zulfiqar as Akash
 Priti Soni as Reena
 Himani Shivpuri as Reena's Mom
 Anil Dhawan as Reena's Father
 Rajesh Khera as Sandy
 Aman Verma as Rahul
 Abhilasha Das as Priya
 Aishwarya Sakhuja as Nisha
 Nathassha Sikka as Donna
 Vipul Roy as Rajiv
 Partha Sarathi Ray as Parag
 Narendra Jaitley as Ravi
 Sunil Nagar as Rajiv's Dad
 Neha Gupta as Rajiv's Mom
Karmveer Choudhary as Police Commissioner 
 Ravi Dubey as Ashok (Extended Cameo)

Soundtrack
The film's soundtrack is composed by Sanjeev Darshan with lyrics by Sameer.

Track listing

References

External links 
 
 
 Bollywood Hungama
 News- Times of India
 News - Yahoo

2011 films
Indian remakes of American films
Indian romantic comedy films
2010s Hindi-language films
2011 romantic comedy films